The Leeds municipal elections were held on Thursday 8 May 1952, with one third of the council to be elected.

Along with the rest of the country, Leeds saw a sharp swing from the Conservatives to Labour with a swing of over 15%, resulting in Labour receiving their highest post-war vote and making nine gains (alongside a gain in the interim) to whittle the Tory majority down to just two. Labour's nine gains were in the wards of Armley, Beeston, Blenheim, Bramley, Cross Gates, Stanningley, Westfield, Woodhouse, and Wortley. They also narrowly missed out on gaining Harehills. With the exception of a close-run victory in Beeston, the remarkably large swing made the Labour gains fairly comfortable. Turnout fell by two percent from the previous year, to 43.9%.

Election result

The result had the following consequences for the total number of seats on the council after the elections:

Ward results

References

1952 English local elections
1952
1950s in Leeds
May 1952 events in the United Kingdom